Ilson Amâncio Carreiro Júnior (born 26 June 1991 in Belo Horizonte), better known as Junior Carreiro, is a Brazilian former professional footballer. He is now a football agent registered with the Brazilian Football Confederation.

Career
Carreiro played his youth football at América. He also played futsal for Minas and was called up twice for the state team FMFS.

He started his professional career at Náutico in 2009. He signed with D.C. United in 2010 and moved to Salgueiro in 2012.

Carreiro's career was ended by a left ankle injury.

References

Personal life
Junior Carreiro is the young brother of Fred Carreiro and his former teammate at D.C. United in 2011 MLSseason.

Education

Carreiro has a BA in theology, an MBA in sports and business management, and a graduate degree in sports law.

External links
 

1991 births
Living people
Brazilian footballers
Brazilian expatriate footballers
Clube Náutico Capibaribe players
D.C. United players
Footballers from Belo Horizonte
Expatriate soccer players in the United States
Major League Soccer players
Association football midfielders
Sports agents
Brazilian football agents